Training Day: The Soundtrack is the soundtrack album to Antoine Fuqua's 2001 crime film Training Day. It was released on September 11, 2001 through Priority Records and contained mostly hip hop music.

Recording sessions took place at Chung King Studios, at Sony Studios, at Mirror Image Studios, at Daddy's House Recording Studio and at D&D Studios in New York, at Encore Studios, at Record One, at Studio 56, at Village Recorders, at Ameraycan Studios and at View Park Sound Lab in Los Angeles, at Stankonia Recording in Atlanta, and at Windmark Recording Studios in Virginia Beach.

Production was handled by DJ Muggs, DJ Battlecat, DJ Premier, DJ Shok, Donald "XL" Robertson, Dr. Dre, Floss P, Jason "Jay E" Epperson, Mario Winans, Nottz, Pharoahe Monch, Sean "Puffy" Combs, Rockwilder, The Neptunes and Waiel "Wally" Yaghnam, with David M. Ehrlich, Doug Frank, Gary Lemel and John Houlihan serving as executive producers.

It features contributions from Big Azz Ko, Black Rob, C-Murder, Cypress Hill, DJ Quik, Dr. Dre, Gang Starr, Kain, King Jacob, Kokane, Krumbsnatcha, Mark Curry, Mark Mancina, Mimi, M.O.P., Napalm, Nelly, P. Diddy, Pharoahe Monch, Professor, Ras Kass, Roscoe, Saafir, Soldier B, the Clipse, The Lox, Trick Daddy, Xzibit and David Bowie.

The album did fairly well on the Billboard charts, peaking at number 35 on the Billboard 200, number 19 on the Top R&B/Hip-Hop Albums chart and number 3 on the Top Soundtracks chart, and spawning two hit singles, "#1" by Nelly and "Put It on Me" by Dr. Dre, DJ Quik and Mimi. "The Squeeze" was originally released as a 12" single, but was quickly pulled off shelves because of sample clearance issue. The single also has a special back cover, which says in big white letters, "In Stores September 11, 2001".

Track listing

Notes
Track 2 features backing vocals from Jason and Jonathan Soto also known as the Soto Twinz

Sample credits
Track 2 contains elements from "Exaltation" written and performed by Wolfgang Käfer
Tracks 4 and 17 contains film dialogue from the Warner Bros. motion picture Training Day
Track 7 contains an interpolation of "Fuck tha Police" written by O'Shea Jackson, Lorenzo Patterson and Andre Young and performed by N.W.A
Track 10 contains an interpolation of "This Is Not America" written by David R. Jones, Pat Metheny and Lyle Mays and performed by David Bowie

Other songs
Four songs not present on the album, but present in the movie and the trailer are, respectively:
"Still D.R.E." by Dr. Dre featuring Snoop Dogg
"(Rock) Superstar" by Cypress Hill
"Last Resort" by Papa Roach
"Letter To The President" by 2Pac and the Outlawz.

Personnel

Demetrius "Krumbsnatcha" Gibbs – performer (track 2)
Jamal "Lil' Fame" Grinnage – performer (track 2)
Eric "Billy Danze" Murray – performer (track 2)
Jason Soto – backing vocals (track 2)
Jonathan Soto – backing vocals (track 2)
Dominick "Nottz" Lamb – producer (track 2)
Michael Conrader – recording & mixing (track 2)
Rock Logic – additional mixing (track 2)
Halsey Quemere – assistant recording & mixing (track 2)
Eddy Schreyer – mastering (tracks: 2, 3, 6-8, 10-17)
Alvin "Xzibit" Joiner – performer (track 3)
John "Ras Kass" Austin – performer (track 3)
Reggie "Saafir" Gibson – performer (track 3)
Kevin "Battlecat" Gilliam – producer & mixing (track 3)
Michelle Lynn Forbes – recording (track 3)
Richard "Segal" Huredia – engineering (track 3)
Andre "Dr. Dre" Young – performer, producer & mixing (track 4)
David "DJ Quik" Blake – performer (track 4)
Mimi  – performer (track 4)
Brian Gardner – mastering (track 4)
Cornell "Nelly" Haynes – performer (track 5), executive producer (track 14)
Waiel "Wally" Yaghnam – producer (track 5)
Matt Still – recording (track 5)
Russell Giraud – recording (track 5)
Rich Travali – mixing (track 5)
Peter Vassos – mastering (track 5)
Troy "Pharoahe Monch" Jamerson – performer & producer (track 6)
Ben Briggs – recording (track 6)
Booker T. Jones III – mixing (track 6)
Jeffrey Phurrough – assistant engineering (track 6)
Corey "C-Murder" Miller – performer (track 7)
Maurice "Trick Daddy" Young – performer (track 7)
Donald "XL" Robertson – producer (track 7)
Claude Achille – recording & mixing (track 7)
David "Styles P" Styles – performer (track 8)
Jason "Jadakiss" Phillips – performer (track 8)
Sean "Sheek Louch" Jacobs – performer (track 8)
Michael "DJ Shok" Gomez – producer (track 8)
Chris Theis – recording & mixing (track 8)
Steve Conover – recording (track 8)
A. "Napalm" Stanton – performer (track 9)
Dana "Rockwilder" Stinson – producer (track 9)
Tommy Uzzo – recording (track 9)
Michael Hogan – mixing (track 9)
Emily Lazar – mastering (track 9)
Sean Combs – performer & producer (track 10)
Tommie "Big Azz Ko" Gibson – performer (track 10)
Robert "Black Rob" Ross – performer (track 10)
Gylan "Kain" Cioffie – performer (track 10)
Mark Curry – performer (track 10)
David Robert "David Bowie" Jones – performer (track 10)
Mario "Yellow Man" Winans – producer (track 10)
Jim Janik – recording (track 10)
Lynn Montrose – assistant recording (track 10)
Paul Logus – mixing (track 10)
Louis "B-Real" Freese – performer (track 11)
Senen "Sen Dog" Reyes – performer (track 11)
Jerry "Kokane" Long – performer (track 11)
Lawrence "DJ Muggs" Muggerud – producer (tracks: 11, 15), mixing (track 11)
Troy Staton – recording & engineering (track 11)
Gene "Malice" Thornton – performer (track 12)
Terrence "Pusha T" Thornton – performer (track 12)
Chad Hugo – producer & recording (track 12)
Pharrell Williams – producer (track 12)
Serban Ghenea – mixing (track 12)
Keith "GuRu" Elam – performer & co-producer (track 13)
Christopher "DJ Premier" Martin – producer (track 13)
Eddie Sancho – mixing (track 13)
Dexter Thibou – assistant engineering (track 13)
"King Jacob" Thomas – performer (track 14)
Prentiss "Professor" Church – performer (track 14)
Jason "Jay E" Epperson – producer (track 14)
Prince Charles Alexander – mixing (track 14)
David "Roscoe" Williams – performer (track 15)
Brandon Abeln – recording & mixing (track 15)
Soldier B – performer (track 16)
Floss P – producer (track 16)
Janine Moret – recording (track 16)
Steve Harvey – mixing (track 16)
Mark Mancina – performer & composer (track 17)
Don L. Harper – conductor (track 17)
Johnny Whieldon – coordinator (track 17)
Dave Metzger – orchestra (track 17)
Adrian Lee – programming (track 17)
Greg Dennen – recording (track 17)
Steve Kempster – engineering & mixing (track 17)
Charles Choi – additional engineering (track 17)
Brian Dixon – assistant engineering (track 17)
David M. Ehrlich – executive producer, A&R
John Houlihan – executive producer, supervision
Douglas Paul Frank – executive producer
Gary LeMel – executive producer
Maggie Schmidt – art direction
Will Ragland – illustration, design
Robert Zuckeman – photography
Ted Reed – coordinator
Jesse Stone – A&R coordinator
Mike Baiardi – A&R administrator
Chuck Wilson – additional A&R
Sheila Bowers – management

Charts

Year-end charts

References

External links

Hip hop soundtracks
2001 soundtrack albums
Albums produced by Nottz
Thriller film soundtracks
Albums produced by Dr. Dre
Albums produced by DJ Muggs
Priority Records soundtracks
Albums produced by DJ Premier
Albums produced by Rockwilder
Albums produced by Sean Combs
Albums produced by the Neptunes
Albums recorded at Chung King Studios
Albums produced by Battlecat (producer)